Rhinechis can mean:

 A synonym for the genus Vipera, the old world vipers
 Rhinechis, the monotypic genus for the Ladder snake